Samantha Salas Solís (born December 15, 1986) is a Mexican racquetball player. Salas is the current World Champion in both Women's Doubles - winning that title for a fifth time with Paola Longoria at the 2022 World Championships in San Luis Potosí, Mexico - and Mixed Doubles with Rodrigo Montoya. She is also the current Pan American Games Champion in Women's Doubles, winning that title with Longoria for a third consecutive time in 2019 in Lima. Salas was the second Mexican woman to finish in the top 10 rankings on the women's pro tour, doing so at the end of the 2006–07 season. Salas was ranked 3rd at the end of the 2019-20 Ladies Professional Racquetball Tour (LPRT) season, which was her tenth season in the top 10.

Professional career
Salas won her first women's pro event in Olympia, Washington November 2010 in only her second pro final. In 2010–11, she reached the semi-finals or better in nine of the ten pro tournaments, including a semi-final finish at the 2010 US Open, which all led to her career high rank of No. 3 at season's end.

In 2011–12, Salas only played the first two events, and then suffered a right shoulder injury that caused her to miss the rest of the season, but she returned to the tour in 2012–13, and equaled her career best by finishing 3rd at the end of the 2012–13 season.

Salas won her second LPRT title in June 2017 in Guadalajara, Mexico, where she came back from two games down to defeat Paola Longoria in the semi-finals, and then beat Rhonda Rajsich in the final. Salas then had shoulder surgery again, and was out of action until 2018.

But shortly after her return to the LPRT, Salas won her third career title at the 2018 Battle at the Alamo in San Antonio in April. Salas played Longoria in that final, and as in Guadalajara, found herself down 0–2, but she came back to win, 5–11, 5–11, 11–9, 11–9, 11–4.

International career
Playing for Mexico, Salas has been a gold medalist 11 times, including three World Championships in doubles with  Paola Longoria. They won at the 2010 World Championships defeating then defending champions Jackie Paraiso and Aimee Ruiz of the US to capture the first women's doubles championship for Mexico and only the second title for a non-American team. Salas and Longoria have won two more titles: in 2012, when they also won the women's team title, and in 2014 Salas was also a bronze medalist in singles in 2014, losing to Rhonda Rajsich in the semi-finals.

Salas has won five Pan American Champion in women's doubles, winning in 2011, 2012 and 2015 with Longoria, and in 2010 and 2014 with Susana Acosta.

Salas also won gold at the 2011 Pan American Games in Guadalajara, Mexico in both the women's doubles (with Longoria) and the women's team events. Finally, she and Nancy Enriquez won gold at the 2006 Central American and Caribbean Games.

At the 2017  Pan American Championships, Salas won Women's Doubles with Longoria, as they defeated Veronica Sotomayor and Maria Paz Muñoz of Ecuador, 15–12, 15–5, in the final, and she was a bronze medalist in Women's Singles, losing to American Rhonda Rajsich in the semi-finals.

Salas played Women's Singles at the 2018 Pan American Championships in Temuco, Chile, where she was a bronze medalist, as she lost to team-mate Longoria in the semi-finals, 15–12, 15–6.

As a junior player, Salas won the International Racquetball Federation (IRF) World Junior Championship in Girls U18 in 2004.

See also
 List of racquetball players

References

External links
 LPRT page for Samantha Salas
 

Living people
Mexican racquetball players
Racquetball players at the 2011 Pan American Games
1986 births
Sportspeople from León, Guanajuato
Racquetball players at the 2015 Pan American Games
Pan American Games gold medalists for Mexico
Pan American Games medalists in racquetball
Central American and Caribbean Games gold medalists for Mexico
Competitors at the 2006 Central American and Caribbean Games
Competitors at the 2010 Central American and Caribbean Games
Competitors at the 2014 Central American and Caribbean Games
Competitors at the 2018 Central American and Caribbean Games
Racquetball players at the 2019 Pan American Games
Central American and Caribbean Games medalists in racquetball
Medalists at the 2011 Pan American Games
Medalists at the 2015 Pan American Games
Medalists at the 2019 Pan American Games
20th-century Mexican women
21st-century Mexican women
Competitors at the 2022 World Games